(wordplay on ōkami (wolf) and kamikakushi (spirited away)) is a Japanese visual novel developed by guyzware (now colorful Inc.) and published by Konami for the PlayStation Portable, with Ryukishi07 of Higurashi no Naku Koro ni fame as game director and the manga author duo Peach-Pit as character designers. The game was released on August 20, 2009 in Japan. An anime adaptation produced by AIC began airing in Japan on January 8, 2010 on TBS.

Plot
A 15-year-old boy, Hiroshi Kuzumi, has recently moved into a new town in the mountains. The town is separated into new and old streets by the river, and many mysterious local customs and practices still remain, and the townspeople are unusually friendly towards him. Although Hiroshi is confused but enjoying his new life, one person has kept her distance from him: class committee member Nemuru Kushinada. In their few encounters she gives him a word of advice: "Stay away from the old streets."

As the story goes on, Hiroshi learns about the town's local traditions and legends—most prominently the ones about the local Wolf Spirits. However, something mysterious is going on in the background; people mysteriously "move away" and students suddenly "transfer schools" while none of the locals pay any attention. Hiroshi initially tries to ignore it, but he soon sees a girl with an enormous scythe along with people in strange masks killing someone who is said to have "moved away" the following day. Hiroshi is soon drawn into the dark secrets long hidden by the townsfolk, and uncovers a plot to destroy the town.

Main characters

Hiroshi is a 15-year-old boy and is the main character of the story. Originally from Tokyo, his family moved to the city of Jōga due to reasons relating to his father's line of work. The kanji for his name can also be read as "Professor", so many people call him Hakase (Professor) as a nickname. Hiroshi is not fond of this nickname, because it makes people believe that he is smarter than he is. Despite this, he still allows Kaname to call him by it. Hiroshi later learns from Nemuru that all humans (known as "Fallen" as opposed to the Godmen as the Jouga wolves call themselves) emit a trace of a scent (undetectable by humans) that is intoxicating to Jouga wolves but emitted in small enough quantities that most of them can resist it without much difficulty (in high enough concentrations this scent can cause them to succumb to their predatory natures and to attack the Fallen). Hiroshi happens to be a Temptation, one human in 100,000, who emits the scent at such concentrations that resistance is almost impossible.

Nemuru 15 years old and the only daughter of the head of the Kushinada clan, the family with the most political power and presence in Jōga. Nemuru, as part of her role as the Hunter, patrols the city at night clad in an elaborate ceremonial outfit and wolf mask and wielding a scythe, hunting for Godmen who have succumbed and started to attack the Fallen, whom she is charged with executing. She is the class president of Hiroshi's class. Nemuru is initially very cold to Hiroshi because she considers him to be a danger. Despite this, she eventually warms towards him and they become friends.

Isuzu is a 15-year-old girl who lives close to Hiroshi. She is tomboyish and extremely affectionate towards Hiroshi, sometimes to his dismay. She had an older brother named Issei, who attended university before succumbing to his predatory instincts and attacking Hiroshi. He was killed by Nemuru. She herself starts to submit and attacks Hiroshi, but manages to stop herself and is spared her brother's fate.

Mana is Hiroshi's 12-year-old sister. She uses a wheelchair due to a car accident. In spite of this, she strives to be independent, and becomes quite annoyed when her brother rushes to her side to help her with the smallest of tasks.

Kaname is a 16-year-old girl who moved to the Jōga with her family a few months before Hiroshi and she is Isuzu's best friend. Being the eldest of their circle of friends (Kaname, Hiroshi and Isuzu), she tends to act as the voice of the reason for the group. Kaname has somewhat of a dark personality, and does not hesitate to tease or trick her two friends. She is interested in the occult and loves city legends and folklore.

She is a local deity who prowls Jōga, carrying out the god of the land's will to rid it of the regressed "wolves". She appears as a young girl wearing an elaborate white outfit and wolf-like mask. She is named after the bodhisattva Kannon.  Her true form is later revealed to be Kaori, a lady who Hiroshi and Mana met while taking a walk.

The eccentric school teacher of Hiroshi's class. He appears to very popular with his students.

A resident of Jouga; she is known in the series for her talent in playing the violin. She's also Mana's music teacher.

A mysterious young man who has made his life's mission on unraveling the mysterious incidents occurring in Jouga. Following the tragic death of his girlfriend Mieko, his ultimate goal is to destroy the entire town-(including the citizens who live there) by creating a huge flood; but he is stopped by Hiroshi and Kaori to prevent him from making that mistake.

Isuzu's older brother and Hiroshi's next-door neighbor. He's a college student at a private university.

Hiroshi and Mana's father. After his wife died a few years prior, he and his two children moved to Jouga due to his work transfer; he works for a book publishing company as a writer.

Adaptations

Internet radio show
An Internet radio show entitled  to promote the anime series started broadcasting on the Animate TV Internet radio service on December 18, 2009 and airs weekly on Fridays. The show is hosted by Yū Kobayashi and Yūko Gotō, who voice Hiroshi Kuzumi and Kaori Mana in the series, respectively.

Manga
A manga adaptation illustrated by Mirura Yano titled  began serialization in the February 2010 issue of ASCII Media Works' Dengeki Daioh shōnen manga magazine and was collected in two volumes. A second manga adaptation illustrated by Kuroko Yabuguchi titled  began serialization in the February 2010 issue of Kodansha's Monthly Shōnen Rival manga magazine and was collected in three volumes.

Anime

An anime television series adaptation produced by AIC and directed by Nobuhiro Takamoto began airing in Japan on January 8, 2010 on the TBS television network. The opening theme  is by FictionJunction and the ending theme  is by Yuuka Nanri. Takumi Ozawa is responsible for the soundtrack.

References

External links
 
Anime official website 
 

2009 video games
2010 anime television series debuts
2010 Japanese television series endings
2010 manga
2010 Japanese novels
Adventure anime and manga
Anime International Company
Anime television series based on video games
ASCII Media Works manga
Dengeki Daioh
Gagaga Bunko
Japan-exclusive video games
Kodansha manga
Konami games
Light novels
Manga based on video games
Mystery anime and manga
Novels based on video games
Peach-Pit
PlayStation Portable games
PlayStation Portable-only games
Psychological thriller video games
Ryukishi07
Sentai Filmworks
Shogakukan manga
Shōnen manga
Thriller anime and manga
TBS Television (Japan) original programming
Visual novels
Video games developed in Japan